Longwan District is an outlying district of the city of Wenzhou, Zhejiang province, China.  It has a population of some 200,000 people in 2000 but grew to almost 750,000 people in 2010 due to rapid urbanization.  It is famous for private enterprises, especially leather and the metal industry. Also, this district is one of the most important one in Wenzhou.

Administrative divisions
Subdistricts:
Yongzhong Subdistrict (永中街道), Haibin Subdistrict (海滨街道), Yongxing Subdistrict (永兴街道), Puzhou Subdistrict (蒲州街道), Haicheng Subdistrict (海城街道), Zhuangyuan Subdistrict (状元街道), Yaoxi Subdistrict (瑶溪街道), Shacheng Subdistrict (沙城街道), Tianhe Subdistrict (天河街道), Lingkun Subdistrict (灵昆街道), Xinghai Subdistrict (星海街道)

References

Districts of Zhejiang
Geography of Wenzhou